Joseph Johnson (12 December 1882 – 1966) was an English professional footballer who played as a forward in the Football League for Clapton Orient. He also played non-League football for Brentford and Hartlepools United before the First World War and for Darlington after it.

Personal life 
Johnson worked at the Royal Arsenal during the First World War.

Career statistics

References

1882 births
Date of death missing
English footballers
Association football outside forwards
Association football inside forwards
Leyton Orient F.C. players
Brentford F.C. players
Darlington F.C. players
English Football League players
Southern Football League players
Footballers from Sunderland
Hartlepool United F.C. players